The College of Horticulture Thenzawl is  one of the constituent colleges of the Central Agricultural University. It is in Thenzawl in the state of Mizoram.

History
Sharad Pawar, during his visit in 2011 had promised to set up a horticulture college in Mizoram. The site was approved in July 2015. The Union Minister of Agriculture and Farmers Welfare Radha Mohan Singh laid foundation stone of the College of Horticulture in 2016.

Location 
It has students from the North Eastern Hill States including Sikkim, Arunachal Pradesh, Meghalaya, Mizoram, Tripura and Manipur.

See also
Thenzawl
Education in India
Education in Mizoram
Mizoram University
Literacy in India

References

External links

Universities and colleges in Mizoram
Education in Aizawl